Service for Ladies may refer to:
 Service for Ladies (1932 film), a British comedy film
 Service for Ladies (1927 film), an American silent comedy film